Mariem Hassan, la voz del Sáhara (Mariem Hassan: the Voice of the Sahara) is a 2007 documentary film directed by Manuel Domínguez.

Synopsis 

Mariem Hassan is the voice of the Sahara, the voice of the desert. Worshipped by the Saharaui in exile, Mariem Hassan instills hope to those who still live in the territories occupied by Morocco. An intelligent woman with an awe-inspiring voice, she has managed to take traditional Saharaui music to the 21st century. The documentary records the many ups and downs of Mariem's life. It reveals her as a "courageous and enduring character who has become one of the most charismatic and respected singers of the world music scene".

To make the documentary, director Manuel Dominguez has accompanied Mariem Hassan on her travels with a camera, selecting from all of her concerts and recordings. His narrative captures the excitement of each "agarit" (cry of the desert). We saw her at the ETNOSOI Festival in Helsinki in 2004, in Les Escales, France, where the concert was transformed into a party with the Tuareg groups that joined the performance, in a theater in Liège singing "Do not abandon me," two days before enduring an operation for cancer, and in recordings made in the desert in Saharawi camps.

Director

The Director, Manuel Dominguez, founded the Nubenegra record company in Madrid in 1994.  Starting with Spanish and Cuban music, the company soon extended its range to new types of music from places such as Equatorial Guinea, Guinea-Bissau, Western Sahara, Brazil and the Sudan. In 1998 Nubenegra published Mariem Hassan's album "Polisario Vencerá", first released in 1982. Since then, Nubenegra has released several of her albums, starting with "Mariem Hassan con Leyoad" (2002). As well as directing the documentary Mariem Hassan, la voz del Sáhara, Manuel Dominguez supplied archival footage of Mariem's career and assisted in the production of the TV show Mariem Hassan: Voice of the Saharwis.

References

External links
Mariem Hassan - La voz del Sáhara (2008) at Internet Archive

2007 films
Spanish documentary films
2007 documentary films
Documentary films about singers
Sahrawi culture
Documentary films about African music
Documentary films about women in Africa
Documentary films about women in music
2000s Spanish films